John Treloar may refer to:
John Treloar (athlete) (1928–2012)
John Treloar (museum administrator) (1894–1952)